Buchert is a surname. Notable people with the surname include:

 Frania Gillen-Buchert (born 1981), Scottish squash player
 Nick Buchert, American basketball official